Halfbreed is the debut album by the Keef Hartley Band. The band was formed when Keef Hartley left John Mayall's band after touring and playing on seven albums (some issued later), including being the only performer besides Mayall on The Blues Alone. Halfbreed includes two spoken passages featuring Mayall, as well as several notable British jazz-rock players.

It was voted number 3 in the All-Time 50 Long Forgotten Gems from Colin Larkin's All Time Top 1000 Albums.

Track listing

1969 LP
Deram SML 1037 (UK), DES 18024 (US)
 "Sacked (Introducing Hearts and Flowers)" (Arranged by Keef Hartley) – 0:40
 "Confusion Theme" (Hartley, Ian Cruikshank) – 1:05
 "The Halfbreed" (Hartley, Peter Dines, Cruikshank) – 6:07
 "Born to Die" (Dines, Hartley, Gary Thain, Fiona Hewitson) – 9:58
 "Sinnin' For You" (Hartley, Dines, Hewitson, Owen Finnegan) – 5:51
 "Leavin' Trunk"  (Sleepy John Estes) – 5:55
 "Just to Cry" (Henry Lowther, Finnegan) – 6:20
 "Too Much Thinking" (Finnegan, Dines, Thain) – 5:30
 "Think it Over" (B.B. King) – 4:59
 "Too Much to Take (Speech)" – 0:32

1995 CD reissue
One Way Records OW 30332
 "Sacked (Introducing Hearts and Flowers)"
 "Confusion Theme"
 "Halfbreed"
 "Born to Die"
 "Sinnin' for you"
 "Leavin' Trunk"
 "Just to Cry"
 "Too Much Thinking"
 "Leave it 'til the Morning"
 "Think it Over"
 "Too Much to Take"

Personnel

The Keef Hartley Band

 Miller Anderson – vocals, guitar
 Peter Dines – organ, harpsichord
 "Spit James" (real name: Ian Cruickshank) – guitar
 Gary Thain – bass guitar
 Keef Hartley – drums
 Henry Lowther – trumpet, violin, brass arrangements
 Harry Beckett – trumpet
 Lyn Dobson – tenor saxophone, flute
 Chris Mercer – tenor saxophone
 John Mayall – voice on "Sacked" and "Too Much to Take"

Technical
 Neil Slaven – producer
 Derek Varnals – recording engineer
 Adrian Martins – assistant engineer
 Bob Baker – front cover photography
 Richard Sacks – inside sleeve photography

References 

1969 debut albums
Keef Hartley Band albums
Deram Records albums
One Way Records albums